von der Decken is a surname. Notable people with the surname include:

 von der Decken family, a German noble family
 Georg von der Decken (1836–1898), German politician (DHP), grandson of Johann Friedrich von der Decken
 Johann Friedrich von der Decken (1769–1840), Hanoverian general and diplomat
 Karl Klaus von der Decken (1833–1865), German explorer of eastern Africa
 Leopold von der Decken (1895–1947), changed his name to John Decker, painter in Los Angeles, grandson of Georg von der Decken